The University Star, also called The Star, is a student-run newspaper for Texas State University. The Star provides news and information on issues that affect the Texas State community as well as San Marcos news.

Distribution
The Star has a daily distribution of 8,000 in the fall and spring semesters.  It is produced on Tuesdays and distributed throughout the San Marcos and Round Rock campuses and San Marcos community.  Content is produced twice during the summer, and has a distribution of 8,000 copies. The Star publishes special issues that complement its regular content throughout the year.

Content
The Star covers of local issues, controversies and events pertaining to the university, San Marcos, Hays County, and higher education. The newspaper is split into four sections: News, Life and Arts, Opinions and Sports.

In November 2017, the paper apologized for running a controversial student op-ed, titled "Your DNA is an Abomination."

History
The first issue was published in February 1911, started by then student Fred W. Adams, son of John Anderson Adams, the founder of Adams Extract and Spice Company. Fred W. Adams persuaded the Southwest Texas Normal School administration to let him publish the newspaper, promising to pay for it himself if advertising could not sustain the cost.

The Star's notable alumni, includes President Lyndon B. Johnson. Johnson served as the newspaper's editor during the summers of 1928 and 1929, using The Star to express his ideas, which were heavily flavored in politics.

The University Star celebrated its 100th anniversary during the 2010–2011 academic year. A reunion was held at the end of April 2010, bringing together both Star staff and alumni from across the country.

The San Marcos City Council declared in 2010 April 26 through May 1 as University Star Week in San Marcos.

Awards
The University Star has won numerous Texas Intercollegiate Press Association (TIPA) awards.

Faculty adviser Bob Bajackson (1999–2017) won the 2010 TIPA Adviser of the Year award

The University Star has also received awards in Hearst Journalism:

David Rauf — 6th place (2006–07) In-Depth writing for "ASG executive officers defend 'conflict of interest' position." The University Star
Colter Ray — 12th place (2008–09) Photography — News & Sports, The University Star
Allen Reed — 17th place (2009–10) Feature writing for "A gift to Science in Death." Houston Chronicle (internship).

References

External links
 

Texas State University
Student newspapers published in Texas
Newspapers established in 1911
1911 establishments in Texas
Weekly newspapers published in Texas